Lapping film, in the telecommunications market, is a precision coated abrasive consumable mainly used for processing and polishing optical fiber connectors. A lapping film is typically a polyester base sheet, coated with precisely graded minerals such as diamond, aluminium oxide, silicon carbide, silicon oxide or cerium oxide. A lapping film is designed to provide a uniform, consistent finish of optical fiber connector end tips to ensure efficient light/signal transmission. They are available in 0.01-45 μm grades, with or without pressure-sensitive adhesive (PSA) backing.

Advantages 
Lapping film is a kind of ultra fine coated abrasive which is quite different from regular abrasives.
 The size of material coated on the lapping film ranges from 0.01-45 μm.
 The base film is polyethylene terephthalate (PET), not paper or fabric.

Applications 

Lapping and polishing fiber optic connections.

Types of lapping film 

Types of lapping film include: diamond, silicon carbide, aluminum oxide.

Main manufacturers 
There are many global manufacturers of lapping film.

References

Abrasives